Tiziano Gemelli (born 2 November 1961 at Pavia, Italy) is an Italian male retired sprinter, who participated at the 1987 World Championships in Athletics.

Achievements

References

External links
 

1961 births
Living people
Italian male sprinters
World Athletics Championships athletes for Italy